Olmsted may refer to:

People 
 Olmsted (name)

Places
 Olmsted Air Force Base, inactive since 1969
 Olmsted, Illinois
 Olmsted County, Minnesota
 Olmsted Falls, Ohio
 Olmsted Point, a viewing area in Yosemite National Park
 Olmsted Township, Cuyahoga County, Ohio
 North Olmsted, Ohio

Other
 Olmsted Brothers, a landscape design firm founded by Frederick Law Olmsted's two sons
 Olmsted syndrome, a congenital keratoderma of the palms and soles

See also
 Olmstead (disambiguation)